Éric Winogradsky (born 22 April 1966) is a French former professional tennis player. He never reached a final in singles on the ATP Tour, but was much more successful in doubles, winning two titles and finishing runner-up at the 1989 French Open.

At the 1987 French Open, Winogradsky upset Stefan Edberg in straight sets en route to the third round.

He was Jo-Wilfried Tsonga's coach from 2004 until 2011.

Career finals

Doubles: 4 (2–2)

External links
 
 
 

1966 births
Living people
French male tennis players
French people of Polish descent
Sportspeople from Neuilly-sur-Seine
20th-century French people
21st-century French people